Lukas Sulzbacher (born 6 April 2000) is an Austrian professional footballer who plays as a rightback for Austrian Bundesliga club Rapid Wien.

Club career
Sulzbacher is a product of the youth academies of Königstetten and Rapid Wien. He made his professional debut with Rapid Wien in a 4-1 UEFA Europa League loss to Arsenal F.C. on 3 December 2020. He ended up making 3 appearances for the club in the Europa League and 1 in the Austrian Football Bundesliga, but his career with Rapid Wien was blighted by injuries and the COVID-19 outbreak. On 30 July 2022, he transferred to WSG Tirol.

International career
Sulzbacher is a youth international for Austria at all levels, having played with them until Austria U21s.

References

External links
 
 OEFB Profile
 OEFB NT Profile

2000 births
Living people
Footballers from Vienna
Austrian footballers
Austria youth international footballers
Austria under-21 international footballers
SK Rapid Wien players
WSG Tirol players
Austrian Football Bundesliga players
Austrian Regionalliga players
Association football fullbacks